Notohadinegoro Airport  is an airport serving Jember, an urban area in East Java Province, Indonesia. This airport is operated by Department of Transportation of Jember Regency (Indonesian: Dinas Perhubungan Kabupaten Jember). This airport became back in operation in July 2014.

Notohadinegoro Airport has an extensive 120 hectares. This airport is expected to serve other cities in Indonesia to Jember.

History 
Notohadinegoro Airport was initiated by former Regent of Jember, Samsul Hadi Siswoyo. Construction began in 2003 with funding from the Jember District Budget (APBD Kabupaten Jember) of 30 billion Rupiah. This airport was inaugurated on 2005 with a runway length of 1,200 metres.

In 2008, the then Regent of Jember, MZA Djalal, asked the airport to expand commercial civilian routes to other cities in Indonesia. The government of the Jember Regency extended the runway from 1,200 metres to 1,560 metres.

As of August 2019, there is a twice-daily direct flight to Juanda International Airport (in Greater Surabaya) from Notohadinegoro Airport.

Facility 
 Terminal building
 Taxi

Airlines and destinations 

The following airlines offer scheduled passenger service:

Statistics

Future development 
The Government of Jember Regency planned in 2015 to extend the runway to 2.500 meters to serve large aircraft at this airport. National Pilot School from Banyuwangi also planned to build Settle Base at this airport in 2015.

References

External links 
 }

Airports in East Java
Transport in East Java